In some forms of photosynthetic bacteria, a chromatophore is a pigmented(coloured), membrane-associated vesicle used to perform photosynthesis. They contain different coloured pigments.

Chromatophores contain bacteriochlorophyll pigments and carotenoids. In purple bacteria, such as Rhodospirillum rubrum, the light-harvesting proteins are intrinsic to the chromatophore membranes. However, in green sulfur bacteria, they are arranged in specialised antenna complexes called chlorosomes.

References

Photosynthesis
Organelles